The Castro of Cidadelhe is a Portuguese castro in civil parish of Cidadelhe, in the municipality of Mesão Frio.

History
Cidadelhe was a fortified settlement of a proto-historic nature, later occupied by Roman and Medieval residents. 

The settlement belonged to a medieval administrative territory conforming to a Suevic parish, with a royal congregation under the order of Ordoño II of León and part of the territory of Portucale (during the second year of his reign, in 911).

Architecture
The castro is located in an isolated rural environment on a hilltop.

Two lines of walls encircle the castle and roadways/paths, composed of schist rock. In the interior of the ruins are several remains of residences, of a circular design, excavated by recent archaeologists. 

Archaeological excavations under the direction of A. Coelho, F. da Silva, A. Baptista Lopes and Manuel Tuna, were attempted into two sectors: one elevated zone, defined by the first series of walls; and the second, lower, new the second series walls.

References
Notes

Sources
 

Cidadelhe
Viseu District
Castro Cidadelhe